John Emmett Pitts Jr. (November 7, 1924 – August 9, 1977) was a brigadier general in the United States Air Force and was director of the International Staff of the Inter-American Defense Board.

Pitts was born in Auburn, Alabama, the son of John E. "Boozer" and Martha Pitts, and attended Auburn High School and The Citadel.  While at The Citadel, he was called to active duty for service in World War II.  Two months after entering the service, he was appointed a cadet at the United States Military Academy.  He was commissioned a second lieutenant in the Army Air Corps in 1946.

In 1951, Pitts served with the 136th Tactical Fighter Group in the Korean War, flying 100 missions in the F-84 Thunderjet fighter-bomber aircraft and receiving the Distinguished Flying Cross and the Air Medal with oak leaf cluster.  In 1952, he was a flight commander of the first mass flight of tactical fighter aircraft across the Pacific Ocean.

Pitts attended the Armed Forces Staff College in 1960 and the Army War College in 1966.  In 1967, he began his service in the Vietnam War serving as director of the Air Force Third Corps Direct Air Support Center at Bien Hoa Air Base. From 1968 through 1971, Pitts served as deputy commandant of cadets for military instruction at the United States Air Force Academy.  Later, he became commander of the Air Force Officer Training School, and, in 1972, vice commander of the Lackland Air Force Base.

In 1974, Pitts became director of the International Staff of the Inter-American Defense Board, a position at which he served the remainder of his career.  Pitts died on August 9, 1977.

Decorations
  Legion of Merit (with Oak Leaf Cluster)
  Distinguished Flying Cross
  Air Medal (with two Oak Leaf Clusters)
  Air Force Commendation Medal (with Oak Leaf Cluster)
  Combat Readiness Medal

From the Republic of Vietnam:

  Air Force Distinguished Service Order (Second Class)
  Vietnam Air Force Meritorious Service Medal
  Air Gallantry Cross (with gold wings)

References

Air Force Link, Biographies: BRIGADIER GENERAL JOHN E. PITTS JR., retrieved July 23, 2007.

Auburn High School (Alabama) alumni
The Citadel, The Military College of South Carolina alumni
People from Auburn, Alabama
Recipients of the Distinguished Flying Cross (United States)
Recipients of the Legion of Merit
Recipients of the Gallantry Cross (Vietnam)
Recipients of the Distinguished Service Order (Vietnam)
United States Air Force generals
United States Military Academy alumni
1924 births
1977 deaths
Recipients of the Air Medal